The Lone Star flag may refer to;

United States
 Flag of Texas, commonly known as the Lone Star Flag
 Bonnie Blue flag, associated at various times with the Republic of Texas, the Republic of West Florida, and the Confederate States of America 
 Lone Star of California, used during an 1836 independence movement from Mexico

Other countries
 Estelada or the Lone Star Flag, the unofficial flag of Catalan independence supporters
 Flag of Chile, or La Estrella Solitaria 'the Lone Star'
 Flag of Cuba, or La Estrella Solitaria 'the Lone Star'
 Flag of Liberia, sometimes called the Lone Star

See also
 Lone Star (disambiguation)
 Red star